Drenovo may refer to:

 In Bulgaria (written in Cyrillic as Дреново):
 Drenovo, Blagoevgrad Province - a village in the Petrich municipality, Blagoevgrad province
 Drenovo, Sofia Province - a village in the Kostinbrod municipality, Sofia province
 Drenkovo - a village in the  Blagoevgrad municipality, Blagoevgrad province, known until 1960 as Drenovo
 In North Macedonia (written in Cyrillic as Дреново):
 Drenovo, Čaška - a village in the Čaška Municipality
 Drenovo, Makedonski Brod - a village in the Makedonski Brod Municipality
 Drenovo, Kavadarci
 In Albania
 Drenovë (written in Bulgarian and Macedonian in Cyrillic as Дреново)

See also
 Dryanovo - a town and municipality in Gabrovo Province, Bulgaria